Andrés Lioi (born 7 March 1997) is an Argentine professional footballer who plays as a right midfielder for Deportivo Madryn.

Career
Lioi played for Renato Cesarini in his youth career before joining Rosario Central, signing his first professional contract with them in November 2017. He was promoted into the first-team midway through the 2017–18 season, making his professional debut on 24 January 2018 in a 1–1 draw with Independiente. Four appearances later, on 17 February, Lioi scored a hat-trick during a 5–0 league win at the Estadio Gigante de Arroyito against Olimpo. After twenty-eight matches across two campaigns for Rosario, Lioi departed on loan on 13 August 2019 to Korona Kielce of Poland's Ekstraklasa.

After twelve appearances for Korona Kielce, Lioi's loan was extended until July - from 30 June - after the end of the 2019–20 campaign was delayed due to the COVID-19 pandemic.

Career statistics
.

Honours
Rosario Central
Copa Argentina: 2017–18

Notes

References

External links

1997 births
Living people
Argentine footballers
Argentine expatriate footballers
People from Rosario, Santa Fe
Footballers from Rosario, Santa Fe
Sportspeople from Rosario, Santa Fe
Association football midfielders
Rosario Central footballers
Korona Kielce players
San Luis de Quillota footballers
Deportes Iberia footballers
Deportivo Madryn players
Argentine Primera División players
Ekstraklasa players
Primera B de Chile players
Segunda División Profesional de Chile players
Expatriate footballers in Poland
Expatriate footballers in Chile
Argentine expatriate sportspeople in Poland
Argentine expatriate sportspeople in Chile